The 2020 Coppa Italia Serie C Final was an association football match between Ternana and Juventus U23 on 27 June 2020 at Stadio Dino Manuzzi in Cesena, Italy. It was the first Coppa Italia Serie C final for both teams.

The match was played behind closed doors due to the COVID-19 pandemic in Italy. It was also due to be played in two legs according the tournament's regulation. However, on 20 June 2020, Lega Pro decided to play the final as a single match in Cesena.

Ternana's Carlo Mammarella scored the first goal in the sixth minute through a free kick. Six minutes later, Matteo Brunori was brought down in the Ternana box and Paterna awarded a penalty. Brunori, scored from the spot to make it 1–1. At the end of the first half, Hamza Rafia scored Juventus U23's second goal after the Antony Iannarilli's save on Brunori's shot and Rafia's rebound. The match ended 2–1 and Juventus U23 won their first trophy of team's history.

As winners, Juventus U23 had a bye for the first two rounds of Serie C promotion play-offs, qualifying to round of 16. The 2020–21 season of the Coppa Italia Serie C will be cancelled due to the COVID-19 pandemic in Italy.

Match 

Assistant referees:Marco TrinchieriEmanuele YoshikawaFourth official:Ermanno Feliciani

Notes

References 

Coppa Italia Serie C
Juventus Next Gen matches
Ternana Calcio matches
Coppa Italia Serie C Finals
June 2020 sports events in Italy
Association football events postponed due to the COVID-19 pandemic
Football in Cesena
2019–20 in Italian football cups